Nandkishore Shamrao Laud is an Indian orthopaedic surgeon who was awarded with the honour of Padma Bhusan, the third highest civilian award of India in 2013.

Education 
Laud holds Master of Surgery (orthopaedics) from University of Bombay. He is the former professor and head, department of orthopaedic surgery and traumatology and chief of trauma service at Lokmanya Tilak Municipal Medical College and General Hospital, Sion, Mumbai. He is currently associated with Laud Clinic, Shushrusha Citizens' Co-operative Hospital and Breach Candy Hospital, Mumbai.

References 

Living people
Indian orthopedic surgeons
Recipients of the Padma Bhushan in medicine
Medical doctors from Mumbai
20th-century Indian medical doctors
Year of birth missing (living people)
20th-century surgeons